The Wasta Rest Stop Tipi-Eastbound and Wasta Rest Stop Tipi-Westbound on Interstate 90 in Wasta, South Dakota were listed on the National Register of Historic Places in 2015.

These are two of nine tipis on Interstate 90 known as "Whitwam's wigwams", designed by Sioux Falls (South Dakota) architect Ward Whitwam, which are landmarks in South Dakota.

References

Commercial buildings on the National Register of Historic Places in South Dakota
Buildings and structures completed in 1900
National Register of Historic Places in Pennington County, South Dakota
Tipis
Interstate 90